The College Language Association (CLA) is a professional association of Black scholars and educators who teach English and foreign languages.  Founded in 1937 by a group of African-American language and literature scholars, the organization "serves the academic, scholarly and professional interests of its members and the collegiate communities they represent."

History
Hugh Gloster, a professor of English at LeMoyne College corresponded with Gladstone Lewis Chandler of Morehouse College about the low English proficiency rates among their students.  Together with other teachers at predominantly Black institutions, they formed the  Association of Teachers of English in Negro Colleges in 1937.  In 1941, the organization broadened their scope and changed their name to the Association of Teachers of Languages in Negro Colleges (ATLNC).  The name was changed again in 1949 to the College Language Association (CLA).

The organization's membership has expanded to an international audience focusing on themes of African American, Caribbean and African diaspora studies.  Members range from undergraduate students to university faculty. Notable contributors include John Frederick Matheus, Therman O'Daniel, Lucy Clemmons Grigsby, A. Russell Brooks, Darwin Turner, Charles A. Ray and Nick Aaron Ford.

Publications
CLA Journal -

References

External links

African-American professional organizations
Learned societies of the United States
Organizations established in 1937
1937 establishments in the United States
Academic organizations